Ann Wilson (born 1950) is an American musician.

Ann Wilson may also refer to:

Ann Wilson in Let's Dance 2010
Ann Wilson (Grange Hill); see List of Grange Hill cast members
Ann Wilson (athlete) (born 1949), British athlete

See also
Anne Wilson (disambiguation)
Anna Wilson (disambiguation)